The pinang scissor or betel nut scissor (kalakati) is a type of scissor from 19th century Bali, Indonesia for cutting betel nuts.

References

Scissors
Indonesian culture